Metallica is a genus of beetles in the family Carabidae, containing the following species:

 Metallica aeneipennis (Dejean, 1831) 
 Metallica capeneri Basilewsky, 1960 
 Metallica mashunensis Peringuey, 1904
 Metallica purpuripennis Chaudoir, 1872 
 Metallica rufoplagiata Basilewsky, 1956 
 Metallica viridipennis Chaudoir, 1872

References

Lebiinae